John Hale (June 3, 1636 – May 15, 1700) was the Puritan pastor of  Beverly, Massachusetts, and took part in the Salem witch trials in 1692. He was one of the most prominent and influential ministers associated with the witch trials, being noted as having initially supported the trials and then changing his mind and publishing a critique of them.

His book, A Modest Enquiry Into the Nature of Witchcraft was published posthumously, two years after his death. The book provides an alternative Christian theory for what actually happened in Salem in 1692, with Hale theorizing that demons impersonated the accused and appeared in their forms to the afflicted. He most likely changed his views about those executed for "being witches" due to the fact that his own wife was accused as being a witch, though never prosecuted.

Biography
John Hale was born on June 3, 1636, in Charlestown, Massachusetts.  The oldest child of Robert Hale, a blacksmith, he was educated at Harvard College in Cambridge, Massachusetts, graduating in 1657. He began preaching in Bass-river-side, later called Beverly, about 1664, and was ordained as the first minister of the parish church there on September 20, 1667, when the congregation formally separated from Salem. He married his first wife, Rebecca Byly, on December 15, 1664, and she died April 13, 1683, at the age of 45.

As a child, Hale had witnessed the execution of Margaret Jones, the first of 15 people to be executed for witchcraft in New England, between 1648–1663. He was present at the examinations and trials of various people who were accused of witchcraft in the Salem witch trials of 1692, and supported the work of the court. However, on November 14, 1692, 17-year-old Mary Herrick accused his second wife, Sarah Noyes Hale, and the ghost of executed Mary Eastey of afflicting her, but his wife was never formally charged or arrested. A later commentator on the trials, Charles Upham suggests that this accusation was one that helped turn public opinion to end the prosecutions, and spurred Hale's willingness to reconsider his support of the trials.

After the trials, Sarah died and Hale began writing his book "A Modest Inquiry into the Nature of Witchcraft", in which he suggested the fear of witchcraft was so great that it impaired the judgment of everyone involved in the trials, possibly resulting in the death of innocent people. Hale died at the age of 63 in 1700, and the book was published two years later.

Fiction

In Arthur Miller's 1953 play The Crucible, a fictional portrayal of Hale appears in Act I in a request from Samuel Parris that he examine his daughter, Betty Parris. Hale's quick visit to help with Betty actually causes him to become one of the main characters in the play.

Hale is depicted as a young minister who has devoted most of his life to the study of witchcraft and other demonic arts in the hope of being able to destroy them in the name of God. He has found a 'witch' in his home town of Beverly, Massachusetts, where he preaches. Hale is the minister in charge of discovering who has marks of the Devil for the witch trials and later is the advocate against them. As a devout Christian, Hale sees it as his duty to seek out the witches, and to 'save their souls'. Hale, after seeing the horrors of the witch trials and watching the loss of both civil and human rights, has a conversion of heart and speaks out against them, telling Judge Danforth that they are morally wrong. Hale leaves the court when Mary Warren accuses John Proctor of witchcraft, famously declaring, "I denounce these proceedings. I quit this court!" to which Danforth replies, running after him, "Mr. Hale, Mr. Hale!"

In the 1957 screen adaptation of Miller's piece, he was depicted by Yves Brainville. In the 1996 film version of the play, he was portrayed by Rob Campbell, as a much younger man than would have been historically accurate, as Hale was fifty-six at the time of the trials; however, the play itself isn't entirely historically accurate, particularly with ages. For instance, Diane E Foulds (along with many others) affirm that Abigail Williams would have been closer to 12 than 17, and that John Proctor would have been near 60, so this change in age for the film version is not entirely out of line with the source material of the play.

In the movie, Hale's wife is accused by Abigail Williams once she begins to suspect him of doubting her claims. This is quickly dismissed by Danforth, leading to Abigail escaping from the village. He then later sadly witnessed the hanging of Rebecca Nurse, Martha Corey and John Proctor.

John Hale is played by Xander Berkeley (as Magistrate Hale) in the 2014 TV series Salem.

Notes

References
 Short biography of John Hale
 Salem Witch Museum
 Reverend John Hale: From Ardent Advocate To Dedicated Critic of the Salem
 Death In Salem, Diane E Foulds. Pub. by National Book Network (2010).
 A Modest Enquiry into the Nature of Witchcraft, by Rev John Hale (1702).

1636 births
1700 deaths
17th-century Christian clergy
17th-century New England Puritan ministers
American people of English descent
Critics of witch hunting
Harvard College alumni
Massachusetts colonial-era clergy
People from Beverly, Massachusetts
People from colonial Boston
People of the Salem witch trials
Supporters of witch hunting